The following people are from Syracuse, New York.

Born or brought up in the City of Syracuse

 Keith B. Alexander – former director of the National Security Agency
 Jabe B. Alford – mayor of Madison, Wisconsin
 Will Allen – Miami Dolphins cornerback
 Jeff Altman – comedian
 Bill Beagle – state senator for the 5th district of the Ohio Senate
 Maltbie D. Babcock – 19th-century clergyman and author
 Dylan Baker – actor
 John William Barker, U.S. Army brigadier general
 Marcus H. Barnum – Wisconsin State Assemblyman
 Kenneth Battelle – world's first celebrity hairdresser; created Jacqueline Kennedy's bouffant
 Kathryn Beare – All-American Girls Professional Baseball League player
 John Berendt – author (Midnight in the Garden of Good and Evil)
 Carlyle Blackwell – silent film actor
 Andray Blatche – player for NBA's Washington Wizards
 Richard Bock - Founder of Pacific Jazz Records
 Tyvon Branch – NFL safety with Oakland Raiders
 Charles F. Brannock – inventor of Brannock Device (standard foot measuring tool)
 Frederick C. Brower – locksmith, inventor, businessman – brought the telephone to Syracuse
 Rick Brunson – Temple University and NBA player
 Ben Burtt – motion picture sound editor; Academy Award winner
 Marty Byrnes – NBA player
 Georgia Campbell – All-American Girls Professional Baseball League player
 Jean Campbell – All-American Girls Professional Baseball League player
 Eric Carle – author of children's books
 Jimmy Cavallo – saxophonist
 Rory Cochrane – actor
 Michael Cole – WWE Friday Night SmackDown and WWE Raw announcer
 Jimmy Collins – NBA player, coach at University of Illinois at Chicago
 Jackie Coogan – briefly as child actor, later known for The Addams Family
 Mark Copani – professional wrestler 
 Bruce Coville – children's author and playwright
 Tom Cruise – Oscar-nominated, Golden Globe Award-winning actor and producer
 Rick Cua – bassist, producer
 Kelly Cutrone – television personality known for The Hills and People's Revolution
 Mabel Potter Daggett – journalist and suffragist
 Robert De Niro, Sr. – abstract expressionist artist; father of actor Robert De Niro
 Mark Didio – wide receiver, Pittsburgh Steelers
 Bill Dinneen – MLB pitcher and umpire
 Frank DiPino – MLB pitcher
Daniel Donigan – also known as Milk, famous drag queen and model
 Jo-Lonn Dunbar – NFL linebacker with St. Louis Rams
 Blanche Dillaye – artist part of the etching revival
 Robert F. Engle – winner of 2003 Nobel Memorial Prize in Economic Sciences
 Joe English – drummer, producer
 Jeanette J. Epps – American aerospace engineer and NASA astronaut
 Walter Farley – author of The Black Stallion
 David B. Feinberg – writer and AIDS activist
 Thom Filicia – interior designer, TV personality on Queer Eye for the Straight Guy
 Jon Fishman – drummer for rock band Phish
 Eliot Fisk – classical guitarist
 Frank Gabrielson – stage, film, and television writer
 John L. Gaunt – photographer, winner of 1955 Pulitzer Prize for Photography
 Richard Gere – Golden Globe Award-winning actor
 Helena Theresa Goessmann – lecturer, academician, and writer
 Bobcat Goldthwait – actor, comedian
 David Greenman – actor
 Henry Grethel – fashion designer
 Bob Gualtieri (born 1961) - sheriff, lawyer, and politician
 Borys Gudziak – Ukrainian Catholic Metropolitan Archbishop of Philadelphia, President of Ukrainian Catholic University
 Jaclyn Hales – actress known for work in the 2011 adaption of Scents and Sensibility
 Michael Herr – author (Dispatches)
Theodore Hesburgh – CSC, former president of the University of Notre Dame
 Siobhan Fallon Hogan – actress appearing in films including Men in Black, Forrest Gump
 Bob Holz – jazz drummer, recording artist
 Honor Bright – pop-punk band
 Mary Dana Hicks – art educator
 Jimmy Howard – NHL goaltender of the Detroit Red Wings
 Chuck Hyatt – college basketball player of 1920s
 David Jennings – Wisconsin State Assemblyman
 Grace Jones – model, actress, singer (born in Kingston, Jamaica)
 John Katko - federal prosecutor, U.S. Congressman
 Megyn Kelly – journalist
 Doris Kenyon – actress
 Mark Kaplan – violinist
 Tom Kenny – voice of SpongeBob SquarePants
 Phyllis Kirk – actress
 David Klein – inventor of Jelly Belly
 Tim Kneale – winner of 1976 Scripps National Spelling Bee
 Zane Lamprey – comedian, actor and reality TV personality, host of Three Sheets
 Dorsey Levens – NFL running back
 Alex "Mine Boy" Levinsky (1910–1990) – NHL hockey player
 Jermain Loguen – abolitionist, clergyman and key contributor to the Underground Railroad
 Claire Luce – actress
 Clifford Luyk – basketball player, named one of FIBA's 50 Greatest Players in 1991
 Joe Magnarelli – jazz musician
 Post Malone – recording artist
 Christopher Maloney – professional musician/educator
 Louis Marshall – lawyer, conservationist, Jewish leader
 Frank Matteo – NFL player
 Edna May – Edwardian musical actress
 Terry McAuliffe – former governor of Virginia
 William "Bill" McCoy – sea captain, rumrunner during the Prohibition in the United States.
 Gordon MacRae – actor and singer, attended Nottingham High School in Syracuse.
 Johnny Messner – actor
Stephen Montague – classical composer
 Darin Morgan – screenwriter
 David Muir – host of ABC World News Tonight
 Jonathan Murray – reality TV producer, Bunim/Murray Productions
 James Nachtwey – photojournalist
 Richard Neer – longtime DJ for WNEW-FM and sports-talk host on WFAN
 Sal Nistico – jazz tenor saxophonist
 Joy Osofsky – clinical and developmental psychologist, professor of clinical psychology and psychiatry, psychoanalyst
 Camille Paglia – social critic, author
 Doe Paoro – singer-songwriter
 Greg Paulus – college basketball and football player
 Steve Perry – lead vocalist for swing-punk group Cherry Poppin' Daddies
 Marco Pignalberi – Alaska state legislator
 Rocco Pirro - NFL guard
 Jon Ratliff – MLB pitcher
 Mark Reed – nanotechnology pioneer
 Jamel Richardson – CFL football player for the Montreal Alouettes, 2010 Grey Cup MVP
 Mike Rotunda – professional wrestler, best known as Irwin R. Schyster
 Margaret Olivia Slocum Sage – philanthropist, established Russell Sage Foundation
 Louis "Red" Salmon – fullback, acting coach of University of Notre Dame football team
 Danny Schayes (born 1959) – college and NBA basketball player 
 George Schuyler – conservative author
 Scott Schwedes – NFL player
 Ray Seals – NFL defensive end with Pittsburgh Steelers and Carolina Panthers
 Rod Serling – screenwriter and TV personality (grew up in Binghamton)
 Martin Sexton – musician, singer, songwriter
 Craig Shirley – author and political consultant
 Ed Stokes – University of Arizona and NBA player
 Edward C. Stearns – founder of hardware concern E. C. Stearns & Company, E. C. Stearns Bicycle Agency, Stearns Steam Carriage Company
 Joseph Stolz – rabbi
 Kevin Surace – INC. 2009 Entrepreneur of the Year, TechTV personality, CEO Serious Materials
 Bob Swan – Intel CEO
 Charles W. Sweeting – Wisconsin State Assemblyman
 Bill Tanguay – football player
 Tommy Tanner – soccer player, owner and head coach of Syracuse Silver Knights
 Tom "Tsquared" Taylor – professional video game player
 Tony Trischka – banjoist, composer 
 Jimmy Van Heusen – composer, authored the jazz standard Darn that Dream
 Frank Whaley – actor
 John Wilkinson – chief engineer and vice-president of Franklin Automobile Company 
 Christopher Woodrow – movie producer
 Toosii- Rapper
 Breanna Stewart- WNBA Player for the Seattle Storm, 1x MVP & 3x All-Star

Born or brought up in Greater Syracuse

 L. Frank Baum – author of the Oz books starting with The Wonderful Wizard of Oz (Chittenango)
 Joey Belladonna – lead singer of heavy metal band Anthrax (Oswego)
 Grover Cleveland – 22nd and 24th President of the United States (Fayetteville)
 Tim Connolly – hockey player with NHL's Buffalo Sabres (Baldwinsville)
 Ronnie James Dio – lead singer of heavy metal bands Rainbow and Black Sabbath (Cortland)
 Pete Dominick – comedian, radio and TV personality (Marcellus)
 Joel Farabee – NHL forward currently playing for the Philadelphia Flyers (Cicero)
 Matilda Joslyn Gage – feminist, abolitionist, suffragist (Fayetteville) 
 Irving Gill – San Diego architect (Tully)
 Tim Green – author, NFL linebacker, Fox NFL commentator (Liverpool)
 Mike Hart – Michigan football player (Nedrow)
 Thomas Harley – 18th overall pick in the 2019 NHL Entry Draft by the Dallas Stars (Jamesville)
 Gary Holland – drummer and vocalist, Dokken, Great White, Blue Cheer (LaFayette)
 Tim Locastro – MLB outfielder (Auburn)
 Dave Mirra – professional BMX rider (Chittenango)
 Harvey A. Moyer – carriage and automobile company founder and president (Clay)
 Bert E. Salisbury – president of Onondaga Pottery Company (O.P.Co.), later renamed to Syracuse China in 1913 and president and general manager of Pass & Seymour, Inc.(Geddes)
 Horatio Seymour – 18th governor of New York, helped the development of the Erie Canal, has a Syracuse street named after him (Pompey)
 Alex Tuch - NHL forward for the Buffalo Sabres (Baldwinsville)
 John Walsh – host of America's Most Wanted (Auburn)

Others with ties to the Syracuse area

 Hervey Allen – author of best-selling Anthony Adverse (1936), which became a film; resided in an extant house on James Street.
 Mary Raymond Shipman Andrews – author of The Perfect Tribute (1906) and other works; resided at Wolf Hollow, the Andrews estate at suburban Taunton, New York.
 Carmelo Anthony – NBA player; played basketball at Syracuse University, delivering the program's only NCAA Championship in 2003.
 Danny Biasone – founding the NBA's Syracuse Nationals in 1946, now the Philadelphia 76ers.
 Joe Biden – 46th President of the United States. Attended Syracuse University College of Law, graduating in 1968.
 Lucy Wood Butler – first president of the Woman's Christian Temperance Union of New York; lived in Syracuse for more than 50 years.
 DeWitt Clinton – senator, Mayor of New York City and sixth governor of New York. Major role in the construction of the Erie Canal.
 Elizabeth Cotten – folk singer and guitar player who lived much of her later life in Syracuse, and for whom a bronze statue is dedicated.
 Asa Danforth – early settler, built a grist mill and sawmill that contributed to the growth of Onondaga County.
 Asa Danforth Jr. – early settler, land speculator and highway engineer.
 Herbert H. Franklin – automobile manufacturer, for whom Franklin Square is named after.
 James Geddes – engineer, surveyor, New York State legislator and U.S. Congressman and one of the main creators of the salt industry at Onondaga Lake near Syracuse.
 Theodore E. Hancock – lawyer and politician. Established law firms in Syracuse and served as district attorney of Onondoga County from 1890 to 1892.
 Bucky Lawless – professional welterweight boxer, lived in Syracuse in early 1930s. Trained and fought in Syracuse from mid-1920s to mid-1930s.
 Simon Le Moyne - French Jesuit priest who in 1655 founded a missionary known as  Sainte Marie de Gannentaha.
 Pierre-Esprit Radisson - French explorer and coureur des bois who traveled into Onondaga and briefly lived in Le Moyne’s missionary community.
 C. Hamilton Sanford – president of the Syracuse Trust Company and co-founder of Sanford-Herbert Motor Truck Company.
 Comfort Tyler – early settler of Syracuse, businessman and politician, Comfort Tyler Park in Syracuse named for him.
 William Van Wagoner – bicycle racer, automobile designer and Syracuse businessman.
 David Foster Wallace – author, wrote much of his landmark novel Infinite Jest while living in a small apartment on Kensington Rd. across from the food co-op.
 Ephraim Webster – first non-missionary white settler of the area that became Syracuse, translator and acted as agent for the Onondagas.
 John Wilkinson – town planner, lawyer, politician, banker who gave Syracuse its name and founded the Syracuse Bank.
 Steve Wynn – Las Vegas hotel and casino tycoon (attended Manlius Military Academy, now Manlius Pebble Hill School).

References

Syracuse, New York
Syracuse
People